Dahan-e Falezak is the district center of Shahrak District in Ghor province, Afghanistan. Very close to it is situated the village of Shahrak, which gives the name of the district.

References

Populated places in Ghor Province